Lieutenant General Larry D. James is a former senior officer in the United States Air Force and is currently a civilian NASA administrator. He is the deputy director of NASA's Jet Propulsion Laboratory, where he also acted as the interim director from August 21, 2021 to May 16, 2022. He acts as the Laboratory's Chief Operating Officer responsible to the Director for the day-to-day management of JPL's resources and activities. This includes managing the Laboratory's solar system exploration, Mars, astronomy, physics, Earth science, interplanetary network programs, and all business operations. These activities employ 5000 scientists, engineers, technicians, and business support personnel, generating $1.8 billion in annual revenues. Prior to his current role, he served as the Deputy Chief of Staff for Intelligence, Surveillance and Reconnaissance, Headquarters United States Air Force. James' prior commands included the 14th Air Force and Joint Functional Component Command for Space from Vandenberg Air Force Base in California.

Early life and education
Larry James graduated from the United States Air Force Academy in Colorado Springs, Colorado in 1978 with a Bachelor of Science in astronautical engineering. In 1983, he received his Master of Science degree in aeronautics and astronautics from Massachusetts Institute of Technology in Cambridge, Massachusetts.

Air Force career
James entered the Air Force as a distinguished graduate of the United States Air Force Academy in 1978. His career spanned a wide variety of space operations and acquisition assignments, including astronaut in the Manned Spaceflight Engineer Program, Air Staff program element monitor, Global Positioning System satellite program manager, and Chief of Operations, 14th Air Force.

James has commanded at the squadron, group and wing levels, and was Vice Commander of the Space and Missile Systems Center. He has served on the staffs of Headquarters United States Air Force, United States Space Command and Air Force Space Command. He also served as the Senior Space Officer for Operation Iraqi Freedom at Prince Sultan Air Base, Saudi Arabia. Prior to his last assignment, the general was Vice Commander, 5th Air Force, and Deputy Commander, 13th Air Force, Yokota Air Base, Japan.

James was previously assigned as Commander, 14th Air Force (Air Forces Strategic), Air Force Space Command, and Commander, Joint Functional Component Command for Space, United States Strategic Command, Vandenberg Air Force Base. As the Air Force's operational space component to USSTRATCOM, James led more than 20,500 personnel responsible for providing missile warning, space superiority, space situational awareness, satellite operations, space launch and range operations. As Commander, JFCC SPACE, he directed all assigned and attached USSTRATCOM space forces providing tailored, responsive, local and global space effects in support of national, USSTRATCOM and combatant commander objectives.

NASA
James retired from the Air Force on August 1, 2013, and assumed the role of deputy director of NASA's Jet Propulsion Laboratory on September 23, 2013. He became the interim director of JPL in August 2021, following the return of former JPL director Michael Watkins to academia. He resumed his role of deputy director for JPL following the appointment of Laurie Leshin to the director position on May 16, 2022.

Major awards and other achievements
 Major Awards and decorations
 Command Space Operations Badge
 Basic Intelligence Badge
 Basic Parachutist Badge
  Defense Superior Service Medal with oak leaf cluster
  Legion of Merit with three oak leaf clusters
  Bronze Star Medal
  Meritorious Service Medal with three oak leaf clusters
  Air Force Commendation Medal

 Other achievements
 Top third graduate, Air Command and Staff College
 Top 10 percent graduate, Air War College
 National Finalist, White House Fellow Program

References

External links

Living people
United States Air Force generals
United States Air Force Academy alumni
United States Air Force astronauts
Recipients of the Legion of Merit
American astronauts
American chief operating officers
1953 births